Eco Eye is an Irish television series broadcast on RTÉ One. Presented by Duncan Stewart, it is about environmental issues. It has a reputation for beautiful scenic filming and aerial photography.

Eco Eye is a presenter-led advocacy documentary series that makes an economic case for solving environmental issues. 
It airs every Tuesday at 7pm.

In early years showing on Wednesday at 7.30pm moved to Tuesday at 7pm late 2000's in 2023 a final 6 part series was shown on Thursday's at 8pm ending the series.

A series that was about cutting down on Pollution and reopening of closed railway lines throughout Ireland.

References

External links
 ECO EYE

Environmental television
RTÉ original programming